Bida is city in Nigeria.

Bida may also refer to:

Places
 Bida, part of Eraguene, Algeria
 Bida (North Africa), an ancient city, former bishopric and Latin Catholic titular see
 Bida Emirate, traditional state in Nigeria
 Bida Setar, village in Iran

People
 Bida (footballer) (born 1984), Brazilian footballer
 Alexandre Bida (1813–1895), French painter
 Aliyu Makama Bida (1905–1980), Nigerian politician
 Bartosz Bida (born 2001), Polish footballer
 Sergey Bida (born 1993), Russian épée fencer

Other
 Bida Airstrip in Nigeria
 Bida (moth), a moth genus in the family Xyloryctidae
 Bid‘ah, the Islamic concept of innovation
 Federal Medical Centre (Bida) in Nigeria
 Federal Polytechnic Bida, school in Nigeria

See also
 
 Baeda Maryam (disambiguation), Emperors of Ethiopia